Robert Joel Kulick (January 16, 1950 – May 28, 2020) was an American guitarist and record producer, who worked with numerous acts such as Kiss, W.A.S.P., Alice Cooper, Lou Reed, Meat Loaf, and Michael Bolton. He was born in Brooklyn, New York, and was the elder brother of former Kiss lead guitarist Bruce Kulick.

Early career and Kiss 
Bob Kulick took a chance in late 1972 and auditioned for the lead guitar spot in a then-new band called Kiss. The band, with Gene Simmons, Paul Stanley, and Peter Criss, was very impressed by his performance, however the glitzier Ace Frehley (who auditioned immediately after him) was chosen to fill the spot. Kulick later played (uncredited) on three Kiss albums: Alive II  (three of the five studio tracks), Killers (all four new studio tracks), and some minimal work on Creatures of the Night. He also played on Paul Stanley's 1978 solo album and on his 1989 solo tour.

Other work 

Early in his session career, Bob Kulick played lead guitar for Lou Reed on his Coney Island Baby record. Kulick and brother Bruce both played in singer Michael Bolton's (nee Bolotin) band at this time. Kulick then began a long-running stint in the Neverland Express, Meat Loaf's touring band, on and off for years, which led to appearances on several Meat Loaf albums, most notably on 1984's Bad Attitude. He also formed a band called Balance, with Peppy Castro (aka Emil "Peppy" Thielhelm, formerly of the Blues Magoos) and Doug Katsaros (multi-platinum recording arranger and Broadway conductor), which had modest chart success in the early 1980s, followed up by playing rhythm and lead guitar on Michael Bolton's 1983 self-titled album.

Bob Kulick was involved with a project called Skull, releasing one album, No Bones About It, in 1991. Bruce Kulick, his brother, who would become a member of KISS, co-wrote one song and appeared as a guest guitarist on another track. In addition, Kulick played on the W.A.S.P. albums The Crimson Idol and Still Not Black Enough. He was only involved with the studio work and never toured with W.A.S.P. or became a member of the band. In 1996 he released Murderer's Row with his band of the same name. This group included David Glen Eisley (of Giuffria and Dirty White Boy) on vocals.

Thereafter, Kulick served in various side projects such as Blackthorne and Observation Balloon. He also produced Motörhead's "Whiplash" (winner of the 2004 Grammy Award for Best Metal Performance), produced and played guitar on the theme for WWE wrestler Triple H, and earned 11 platinum or gold records working with Kiss and Diana Ross. Kulick also composed, produced, and performed "Sweet Victory" with Eisley in the SpongeBob SquarePants episode "Band Geeks" on Nickelodeon. The song further appears on SpongeBob SquarePants: The Yellow Album.

Personal life and death 
In 1983, Kulick began a long-term relationship with actress Stella Stevens.

Kulick resided in Las Vegas, Nevada, and was a regular participant in the annual "KISS Night in Las Vegas" fundraiser for music programs in Clark County, Nevada schools until his death.

His family is of Jewish background.

Kulick's death on May 28, 2020, was confirmed by his brother Bruce, stating "I am heartbroken to have to share the news of the passing of my brother Bob Kulick. His love of music, and his talent as a musician and producer should always be celebrated. I know he is at peace now, with my parents, playing his guitar as loud as possible. Please respect the Kulick Family's privacy during this very sad time."

On October 2, 2020, Bruce issued a statement via Facebook on the cause of death, reporting that "Many of you have asked how my brother died. I didn't have the information until a few days ago from the Las Vegas County Coroner.  He died in his home, from natural causes due to heart disease. Sadly, I was unaware that my brother had complained to his doctor about chest pains and heart palpitations. I recently discovered this by looking at his medical papers, and I believe he was due to be treated, but the pandemic might have prevented it. For me this was a shock, as it was so sudden. I hope if you experience any pain or discomfort, please see your doctor. As much as this knowledge about his passing is closure for me and my family, he was too young to die. Thank you all for your support with his passing. I will continue to celebrate his career and share his photos and accomplishments, along with a lighter side of my brother many of you never knew."

Discography

Random Blues Band 
Winchester Cathedral (1966)

Hookfoot 
 Good Times A' Comin' (1972; Kulick only plays on "Sweet Sweet Funky Music")

Michael Wendroff 

 Southpaw (1974)
 Recorded Live (1976)
 Kiss The World Goodbye (1978)

Lou Reed 

 Coney Island Baby (1975)

KISS 

 Alive II (1977)
 Paul Stanley (1978)
 Unmasked (1980)
 Killers (1982)

Balance 

 Balance (1981)
 In For the Count (1982)
 Equilibrium (2009)

Meat Loaf 

 Live at My Father's Place (1977; promo only release)
 Live at the "Bottom Line" in N.Y.C. (1977; promo only release)
 Live at the El Mocambo, January 18, 1978 (1978; promo only release)
 Bad Attitude (1984)
 Bad Attitude Live (1985; VHS)
 Live (at Wembley) (1987)
 Bat Out of Hell: The Original Tour (2009; DVD; televised appearance on Rockpalast, 1978)

Michael Bolton 

 Michael Bolton (1983)

Diana Ross 
  Why Do Fools Fall In Love (1981)
  Mirror Mirror (1981)

W.A.S.P. 

 The Crimson Idol (1992)
 Still Not Black Enough (1995)

Skull 

 No Bones About It (1991)
 No Bones About It: Expanded Edition  (2018)
 Skull II: Now More Than Ever  (2018)

Blackthorne 

 Afterlife (1993)

Murderer's Row 

 Murderer's Row (1996)

Doro 

 Calling the Wild (2000)

Tim Ripper Owens 
 Play My Game (2010)

Solo 
 Skeletons in the Closet (2017)

Other 
 Sweet Victory (2001) (Production music track famously used in the  SpongeBob SquarePants episode "Band Geeks")

Tribute albums 
Bob Kulick produced or co-produced, with partners Bruce Bouillet, Billy Sherwood, and Brett Chassen, multiple tribute and original concept albums, including:

 Little Guitars: A Tribute to Van Halen (1999)
Metallic Attack: Metallica – The Ultimate Tribute (2000)

 Bat Head Soup: A Tribute to Ozzy (2000)

 Stone Cold Queen: A Tribute (2001)
An All Star Lineup Performing The Songs Of Pink Floyd (2002)
 One Way Street: A Tribute to Aerosmith (2002)
 Spin the Bottle: An All-Star Tribute to KISS (2004)
Michael Schenker Group 'Heavy Hitters' classic rock covers (2005)
 Welcome to the Nightmare: An All-Star Salute to Alice Cooper (2005)
 An All-Star Tribute to Cher (2005)
 An All-Star Tribute to Shania Twain (2005)
 Numbers from the Beast: An All-Star Tribute to Iron Maiden (2005)
 Butchering the Beatles: A Headbashing Tribute (2006)
Immortal Randy Rhodes: The Ultimate Tribute (2015)
 We Wish You a Metal X-Mas and a Headbanging New Year (2008, a heavy metal Christmas album created in association with Black Ion Music, a company co-owned by Kulick and talent manager Wendy Dio) — featuring a who's who of rock and roll royalty including Bruce Kulick, Ronnie James Dio, Alice Cooper, Tommy Shaw, Lemmy Kilmister, Dave Grohl, Vinny Appice, Chuck Billy, Billy F. Gibbons
 Sin-Atra (2011) An All Star metal tribute to Frank Sinatra

References

External links 

 
 

1950 births
2020 deaths
Musicians from Brooklyn
American people of Russian-Jewish descent
Kiss (band) personnel
American heavy metal guitarists
Burials at Hollywood Forever Cemetery
Neverland Express members
American male guitarists
20th-century American guitarists
Jewish heavy metal musicians